Lithuanian warship Prezidentas Smetona was the only warship in Lithuanian Navy during the years of the First Republic of Lithuania from 1918 to 1940. It was named after the first President of Lithuania, Antanas Smetona.

Built by Deschimag-Werk Seebeck and launched on October 31, 1917 in Germany, the ship started its career as German minesweeper M59. In 1927 it was purchased by Lithuania for 289,000 litas. It was used to safeguard Lithuanian shores against smugglers and as a training facility for the navy. In 1939–1940 Lithuania ordered more ships, including submarines, from France.

A complement of 48 manned two  guns and three machine-guns. The ship was reconstructed and was officially launched as a warship on August 2, 1935 by captain Antanas Kaškelis.

After the German ultimatum to Lithuania in March 1939, Lithuania lost the port of Klaipėda and Prezidentas Smetona had to be docked in Šventoji.

Lithuania was occupied by the Soviet Union on June 15, 1940 and the vessel became part of the Soviet Navy. Prezidentas Smetona was renamed first as Пирмӯнас (Pirmūnas, Пирмунас) and later as Коралл (Korall). The warship was reconverted in 1943 to a minesweeper and on 29 August 1944 renamed as T-33. It was sunk on 11 January 1945 when it departed from the port of Helsinki. Circumstances of the sinking are unclear: some claim that it was sunk by German , others argue that it hit a naval mine, or, according to the diary of a German sailor, was hit by a German torpedo.

Estonian researchers had announced several times in the press that they have located the wreckage in the Gulf of Finland.

In 2018, a large original flag of the warship was handed to the Lithuanian Sea Museum by Lithuanian descent collector Henry Gaidis.

References

Minesweepers of the Imperial German Navy
Ships built in Bremen (state)
1917 ships
Patrol vessels of the Lithuanian Naval Force
Patrol vessels of the Soviet Navy
Naval ships of Lithuania
Maritime incidents in January 1945
World War II shipwrecks in the Baltic Sea
Shipwrecks in the Gulf of Finland
Ships sunk by German submarines in World War II
Captured ships